The Greek Ecologists (previously Union of Ecologists) is a Greek "fringe" and "bizarre ecological party".

The party's president is Dimosthenis Vergis, a former auto-worker, trade unionist, journalist, and peace activist. Vergis has been described as a "self-styled ecologist" and "a self-styled, modern-day Dionysus – God of wine, revelry and fertility".

Vergis usually deploys naked female party workers in his campaigns and has posed nude for campaign posters and pamphlets, flirting "with any female journalist that comes within groping distance". He supports the legalisation of cannabis and unrestricted nudism.

The Greek Ecologists and its leader are not accepted as a Green party by the Ecologist Greens, which enjoys international recognition as Greece's green party. The Ecologist Greens have condemned Vergis, stating: "The public can be assured that the political culture of Ecologist Greens and the Green movement, in general, has nothing to do with behaviour that makes a mockery or which, through strange - at least - and disastrous interests (such as abuses, money laundering), has damaged the interest in the environment and the political perspectives of ecology in Greece."

History
In 1997, an Athens prosecutor issued a warrant for Vergis' arrest after his party published a poster in which he appeared nude with a smaller picture of International Association of Athletics Federations president Primo Nebiolo inset near Vergis' genitals.

In August 1998, lawyers representing the Archbishop of Athens successfully went to court to prevent the party using a poster in the municipal elections showing Vergis shaking hands with the archbishop.

During the 2000 general election, in which he openly campaigned with semi-nude models, Vergis was described as a "joker" by deputy labour minister Christos Protopappas.

The party was prohibited from participating in the 2004 general election on the order of the Greek supreme court. Subsequently it was renamed to Greek Ecologists.

In 2009 for the European election the famous trash TV singer Nikos Katelis (well known as Katman) became a candidate for this party. His speech in Kolonaki square was shown live on Alter Channel. He lost the elections.

Electoral results

References

External links 
 Archive of Party website

Green political parties in Greece